The Steyr HS .50 and the Steyr HS .460 are single-shot anti materiel sniper rifles manufactured by Steyr Mannlicher and chambered in .50 BMG and .460 Steyr, respectively. Unlicensed variants of the HS. 50 include the AM-50 Sayyad produced by Iran and the Golan S-01 produced by Syria.

Design and features 
The Steyr HS .50 is a single-shot bolt-action rifle. It has no built-in magazine, and each round has to be loaded directly into the ejection port and is pushed into the chamber by the bolt. The fluted barrel is cold hammer-forged and has an effective range of up to 1,500 m. It has an adjustable bipod, a muzzle brake that reduces recoil significantly, and a Picatinny rail for the installation of various optics.

The original Steyr HS-50 was designed by Heinrich Fortmeier, on behalf of Steyr Arms.

Variants

HS .460 
The HS .460 is chambered for the .460 Steyr round, developed for markets where ownership of the .50 BMG by private citizens is banned, but .46 rounds are not, such as California.

HS-50 
The "HS-50" is a single shot bolt action .50 BMG rifle, with 2 barrel length options (29" / 33"), The rifle comes standard with a 0 MOA picatinny rail

HS-50 M1 
The HS .50 M1 is an evolution of the HS .50. It is magazine-fed from a five-round magazine feeding horizontally left from the receiver, has a longer top Picatinny rail and more Picatinny rails on the side, an adjustable cheekpiece, a newly designed fixable bipod, and a monopod at the buttstock.

AM-50 Sayyad 
Iran produces an unlicensed version under the name AM-50 Sayyad. The AM-50 has been in production since 2008 and has been widely exported. Because of its wide exports, AM-50 rifles have also been supplied to or captured by groups opposed to Iran, such as Syrian rebels. The AM-50 reportedly has much worse fit and finish than the Stehr HS .50.

Golan S-01 
In June 2019, media organizations affiliated with the Syrian government reported that Syria had begun producing an unlicensed variant of the rifle, dubbed the Golan S-01, in reference to the Golan Heights.  Unlike the original HS .50, the Golan S-01 fires the Soviet 12.7×108mm anti-materiel rifle cartridge. It is slightly heavier than the HS.50, weighing in at 13.5 kg and has an effective firing range of 1,600 meters, a 100 meter improvement over the previous generation of anti-materiel rifles used by the Syrian Army. It is also 100 mm longer than the HS .50, measuring in at 1,470mm total length.

Users 

  - Used by Argentine Army.
  - Used by Bolivian Army.
  - 800 rifles were purchased in 2006.
  - Used by police forces and special forces.
  - Seen in use of HUR.

AM-50 Sayyad operators

  Asa'ib Ahl al-Haq
  Badr Organization
  Hamas
 Harakat Hezbollah al-Nujaba
  Hezbollah
 
  - Iraqi Special Operations Forces, and the Iraqi Armed Forces.
  Islamic State
  Islamic State Sinai Province
 Kata'ib Sayyid al-Shuhada
  Kurdistan Workers' Party (PKK)
 Liwa al-Zulfiqar
  Liwa Fatemiyoun
 Saraya al-Aqida
 Saraya al-Khorasani
 Saraya al-Salam
 Saraya Ashura
 
  Syrian Social Nationalist Party
  Tahrir al-Sham
  Syrian National Army

Gallery

See also
 Barrett M82, an American anti-materiel rifle
 Denel NTW-20, a South African anti-materiel rifle
 KSVK 12.7, a Russian anti-materiel rifle
 PGM Hécate II, a French anti-materiel rifle
 Steyr SSG 69, an Austrian bolt-action sniper rifle

References

External links
 
 Official website

.50 BMG sniper rifles
Sniper rifles of Austria
Anti-materiel rifles
Single-shot bolt-action rifles
Military equipment introduced in the 2000s